Kim Yeon-ji (born October 30, 1986) is a South Korean singer. She was the lead vocalist of South Korean vocal group SeeYa until becoming a solo artist after SeeYa's disbandment in 2011. During her tenure with the group, Kim was noted for her dynamic vocal style and wide vocal range.

Biography
Kim Yeonji was raised in Anyang, Gyeonggi in South Korea, where she attended Pyeongchon Management High School.

Yeonji entered the Postmodern Music Department at Kyung Hee University in 2008. Yeonji returned to Kyung Hee University's Postmodern Music Department as a full-time student in 2011, focusing on absorbing the department's orientation toward jazz, blues, and cross-cultural music.

In 2013, Yeonji graduated from Kyung Hee University with an unusually high GPA for an entertainment figure after having submitted a portfolio of musical arrangements and a thesis on the songs in which she had participated.

Career

Predebut
Yeonji won awards in various singing and dancing talent contests and was eventually scouted by the record label and management company GM (currently MBK Entertainment). After more than a year of training under the label's auspices, Yeonji debuted as part of the K-pop Pop group SeeYa in 2006.

SeeYa (2006–2011)
Yeonji debuted as lead vocalist of the group SeeYa in 2006. The group officially disbanded on January 30, 2011, after the group final performance on Inkigayo.

Solo career
At the end of 2011, Yeonji appeared during the 2011 SBS Drama Awards as actor Lee Jaeyoon's duet partner for a performance of the Lee So-ra song "Proposal." In early 2012, Yeonji contributed the song "Run" to the vocal music series M/Project, and the song "Love is Right" to the original soundtrack of the jTBC miniseries Padam Padam. In May 2012, the Modern K Music Academy, a prominent K-Pop "incubating" school, announced that Yeonji would be participating as an invited vocal instructor for its summer K-Pop training program in Vancouver, British Columbia, Canada. In March 2013, Lee Jinsung of Monday Kiz announced through Twitter that he had collaborated on a duet song with Yeonji, which he described as "memorable because it was work with a pure person who loves music so much." The song, "Hurting but Happy," was written and produced by Lee and released in March as a preview track from Monday Kiz's fifth LP album. Yeonji contributed the song "In My Eyes" to the SBS miniseries I Can Hear Your Voice in July 2013.

Discography

Singles

Soundtrack appearances

Awards

References

External links
 Kim Yeonji on Maroo Entertainment 

1986 births
K-pop singers
Kyung Hee University alumni
MBK Entertainment artists
Living people
South Korean female idols
People from Gyeonggi Province
South Korean women pop singers
21st-century South Korean singers
21st-century South Korean women singers